The men's 5000 m at the 2010 KNSB Dutch Single Distance Championships in Heerenveen took place at Thialf on Friday 30 October 2009. 20 athletes participated in the contest. Sven Kramer was the title holder. The top five speed skaters qualified for the 5000 m at the 2009–10 ISU Speed Skating World Cup.

Results

Final result

Source:

Notes:
PR = personal record

Draw

References 

Single Distance Championships
2010 Single Distance